Karel Rottiers (born 7 April 1953 in Bornem) was a Belgian professional road bicycle racer. Rottiers won the 3rd stage of the 1975 Tour de France.

Major results

1969
 national Novice Road Race Championship
1973
Omloop van de Grensstreek
1975
Tour de France:
Winner stage 3
1976
Strombeek-Bever

External links 

Official Tour de France results for Karel Rottiers

Belgian male cyclists
1953 births
Living people
Belgian Tour de France stage winners
People from Bornem
Cyclists from Antwerp Province